Jody Vance (born August 23, 1967) is a Canadian sports anchor and former co-host of Breakfast Television (BT) on CKVU-DT in Vancouver. In 2000, she became the first woman in the history of Canadian television to host her own sports show in primetime.

Broadcasting career
Vance began her broadcast career on CHRX, and then moved to CFMI-FM/CKNW as the assistant promotions director and on-air fill-in talent. When BCTV called in 1995, she reached her lifelong goal of becoming a sports anchor.

After a short stint with BCTV, Vance helped launch the sports department at Vancouver Television where she honed her craft and learned the ins and outs of sports television as the sole member of the sports department. In the summer of 1999, she worked as a fill-in anchor for Sportsnet, a new Canadian sports network and became the first woman to host the desk for network. In March 2000, she moved to Toronto to host of Sportscentral AM. After ratings increased, she was moved to the coveted evening time slot and, on September 4, 2000, Vance became the first woman in the history of Canadian television to host her own sports show in primetime.

After leaving Sportsnet in 2005, Vance was lead anchor at Leafs TV, the Toronto Maple Leafs-owned hockey channel from 2006 to 2009. Her final pregame was April 11, 2009, as the Leafs hosted the Ottawa Senators. In June 2009, Vance joined Shore 104 FM in Vancouver where she hosted an afternoon program called The Jody Vance Show. She also joined CBC Vancouver doing sports on top of her work at Shore 104.3 FM and hosted the Vancouver Canucks playoff post game show, "Seeking Stanley".

In October 2011, Vance was hired away from radio and the CBC to host/news anchor BT for City, where she re-joined some of her former Sportsnet colleagues. She was featured on Sportsnet Pacific Vancouver Canucks broadcasts as a panelist during intermissions. Vance was part of the on-air crew for the 2012 CONCACAF Women's Olympic Qualifying Tournament at BC Place broadcast nationally on Sportsnet. In May 2016, it was announced she was no longer with BT.

In September 2017, Roundhouse Radio unveiled that Vance will be their new midday host.

References

External links 
 Breakfast Television bio (archived)
 A Tale of Two Hosts (UBC article on Jody Vance & Jim Van Horne)
 
 

1967 births
Living people
Canadian radio sportscasters
Canadian television sportscasters
People from Vancouver
Women sports announcers
Canadian television hosts
Canadian television journalists
Canadian women television journalists
Canadian women television hosts